Leonard Kornoš (born 1956) is a Slovak astronomer and a prolific discoverer of asteroids.

Career 

He is a lecturer at Comenius University in Bratislava, Slovakia, and known for his astrometric and photometric observations of asteroids and comets. His research includes the relations between meteoroid streams and their parent bodies. He is credited with the discovery of 37 minor planets, many of which are co-discoveries with astronomers Peter Kolény, Juraj Tóth, Adrián Galád, Dušan Kalmančok, Štefan Gajdoš and Jozef Világi.

Awards and honors 

The asteroid 23899 Kornoš, discovered by LONEOS at Anderson Mesa Station in 1998, was named in his honor. The official naming citation was published by the Minor Planet Center on 12 July 2014.

List of discovered minor planets

See also

References 
 

1956 births

Discoverers of asteroids
Slovak astronomers
Living people